Rodolfo Marcelo Espinal Paniagua (born 24 February 1993) is a Honduran footballer who plays as a defensive midfielder for C.D. Victoria in the Liga de Ascenso. He represented Honduras in the football competition at the 2016 Summer Olympics.

References

Honduran footballers
1993 births
Living people
Footballers at the 2016 Summer Olympics
Olympic footballers of Honduras
Association football defenders